Growth is a centrist political party in Latvia. It was founded on March 27, 2013 by cardiologist Andris Skride who is a member of the Development/For! alliance. It is governed by a board of five members – Artūrs Ancāns, Artūrs Čačka, Andris Skride, Rita Turkina un Juris Žilko.

The party participated in the 2014 Latvian parliamentary elections, placing second-to-last.

In March 2018, Growth voted to form the Development/For! party alliance with the liberal For Latvia's Development and Movement For! parties to run in the 2018 Latvian parliamentary election. The alliance won 13 seats in the Saeima, with one seat won by party leader Skride. The alliance became the biggest party at the 2020 Riga City Council elections on a joint list with The Progressives, although none of the four Growth candidates running were elected.

Party ideology 
The party does not have a specific ideology, although it has been described as regionalist, with its program focusing on increasing public health and research spending, government efficiency and strengthening the judiciary. The program also expresses support for adopting a progressive tax model.

Election results

Legislative elections 

The party currently also has elected members in the councils of Madona Municipality and Ķekava Municipality.

References

External links 
 Official website

Political parties in Latvia
2013 establishments in Latvia
Centrist parties
Political parties established in 2013
Centrist parties in Latvia